Henry Huntington may refer to:

Henry E. Huntington (1850–1927), American railroad magnate and art collector
Henry S. Huntington, American Presbyterian minister and advocate of nudism
Henry Huntington (politician), member of the 28th New York State Legislature

See also 
 Henry Huntingdon (disambiguation)